Worm theology is the idea in Christian culture that in light of God's holiness and power an appropriate emotion is a low view of self. The name may be attributed to a line in the Isaac Watts hymn Alas! and Did My Saviour Bleed (Pub 1707) which says "Would he devote that sacred head for such a worm as I?" This thinking was prevalent in the days when this hymn was originally written, perhaps because there was also a higher view of God. Furthermore, worm theology can be attributed to a recognition of the ugliness of sin, resulting in contrition.

Origins 
John Calvin (1509–1564) a 16th-century theologian and Protestant reformer much of his theological thinking was similar to Augustine of Hippo (354-430). Calvin saw the human race as being totally unable to do anything for itself to free itself from the stranglehold of sin, hence the reason why Jesus came to reveal what God the Father was really like (John 14:6) and that it is only through faith in Jesus and a continual yielding of self to the Holy Spirit that one is able to have an intimate relationship with a holy and righteous God.

There are three passages in the Old Testament that ascribe the term "worm" to human beings: Isaiah 41:14, Job 25:4-6, and Psalm 22:6.

References

Christian theology